Caesar Creek and Caesar's Creek may refer to:

Caesar Creek (Ohio), a river in Ohio
Caesar Creek State Park, a state park in Ohio
Caesar Creek Township, Dearborn County, Indiana
Caesar's Creek Pioneer Village, in Waynesville, Ohio